NRTL may refer to:

 Nationally Recognized Testing Laboratories
 National Right To Life
 Navio da República Timor-Leste, "Ship of the Republic of East Timor", ship prefix identifying a commissioned ship of the East Timorese Navy or National Police.
 Non-Random Two Liquid model